Vacha may refer to:
Acorus calamus, Vacha (Sk 'to speak') an ayurvedic medicine, mentioned in the bible
Vacha Reservoir, a reservoir in Bulgaria
Vacha (river), a river in Bulgaria
Vacha (Verwaltungsgemeinschaft), a Verwaltungsgemeinschaft in the district Wartburgkreis in Thuringia, Germany
Vacha, Germany, a town in Thuringia, Germany
Vacha, Russia, name of several inhabited localities in Russia

People
Vácha, Czech surname